Sushil Kumar Singh (born 27 June 1963) is an Indian politician and is currently a Member of Parliament in the 16th Lok Sabha from Aurangabad Lok Sabha constituency in Bihar. He has been elected as a Member of Parliament  in the 12th Lok Sabha and the 15th Lok Sabha. He is a member of Bharatiya Janata Party, which is  ruling party in the Indian Parliament. He is a member of the Standing committee on Coal and Steel, Committee on Public Undertakings and Committee on Petitions. and Consultative Committee of Ministry of Road, Transport and Highways in the 17th Lok Sabha. He joined Bhartiya Janata Party  on 7 March 2014 in presence of Rajnath Singh. Earlier he was associated with Janata Dal (United), the ruling party in the state of Bihar.

Early life 
He was born in Aurangabad to Ramnaresh Singh (Lutan singh) and Pushpalata Singh. He completed his early schooling from Gate School (A N High School), Aurangabad, and then enrolled at Banaras Hindu University for his pre-University studies. He graduated in political science from Anugrah Narayan College, Patna, Magadh University.

Election Results

References

Living people
1963 births
Lok Sabha members from Bihar
India MPs 1998–1999
India MPs 2009–2014
People from Aurangabad district, Bihar
India MPs 2014–2019
Janata Dal (United) politicians
Bharatiya Janata Party politicians from Bihar
Samata Party politicians
India MPs 2019–present

Indian Hindus